The 2nd Combined Cossack Division was a Cossack division in the Russian Imperial Army formed from Don, Kuban, and Terek Cossacks. It saw action in World War I as part of the 12th Army Corps and later was demobilized in 1918.

Organization 
The division consisted of the following units:
1st Brigade (HQ Mogilev-Podolsk)
16th Don Cossack General Grekov VIII Regiment
17th Don Cossack General Baklanov Regiment
2nd Brigade (HQ Kamenets-Podolsk)
1st Kuban Cossack General Velyaminov Line Regiment
1st Terek Cossack Volgsky Regiment
1st Orenburg Cossack Artillery Division (HQ Kamenets-Podolsk)

Commanders 
The following is the list of the division commanders.
28.07.1899 – 14.09.1904 – Major General (later Lieutenant General) Alexei Domontovich 
14.10.1906 – xx.11.1907 – Major General (later Lieutenant General) Mikhail Stoyanov 
19.11.1907 – 14.09.1911 – Lieutenant General Nikolai Avdeyev     
14.09.1911 – 31.12.1913 – Lieutenant General Alexei Rodionov
31.12.1913 – 24.09.1914 – Lieutenant General Leonid Zhigalin    
24.09.1914 – 10.09.1915 – Lieutenant General Alexander Pavlov 
16.09.1915 – 10.06.1917 – Major General Pyotr Krasnov 
26.09.1917 – ? – Major General Alexander Cheryachukin

Chiefs of Staff 
The following is a list of the division chiefs of staff.
15.09.1889-02.08.1891 — Colonel Dmitry Voronets 
15.11.1894-30.12.1899 — Colonel Pavel Parchevsky 
22.02.1900-25.05.1900 — Colonel Ivan Tolmachev 
25.07.1900-09.02.1902 — Colonel Vladimir Khitrovo 
16.02.1902-06.03.1905 — Lieutenant Colonel (later Colonel) Mikhail Shishkevich 
25.03.1905-09.07.1908 — Colonel Ivan Bolotov 
25.08.1908-02.09.1910 — Colonel Anatoly Kalishevsky 
12.09.1910-30.12.1914 — Colonel Andrei Snesarev 
?-26.07.1915 — Colonel Vladimir Agapeyev 
16.08.1915-21.03.1917 — Lieutenant Colonel (later Colonel) Svyatoslav Denisov 
16.05.1917-? — Nikolai Rot

References

External links 
 2-я Сводная казачья дивизия на Regiment.ru

Cavalry divisions of the Russian Empire
Cossack military units and formations
Military units and formations established in 1889
Military units and formations disestablished in 1918